Sinima Beats is an online music licensing company founded in New York City that distributes instrumentals for songwriters, singers, rappers, film makers, or app developers.  Sinima Beats is a registered Broadcast Music, Inc. member as a publisher. "Sinima Beats" is also a registered trademark.

History 
Sinima Beats was founded in May 2005 and offers a vast array of urban, rock, rnb, pop, dance, reggae, dubstep and soundtrack instrumentals through various independent music websites; primarily SoundClick.  The company gained recognition through the internet, with its quality and unique instrumentation. Due to widespread popularity, Sinima Beats began to license its music through the internet to aspiring artists, royalty-free.  These licenses give independent artists the opportunity to record songs over instrumentals and commercially distribute their songs without having to pay additional fees.  All instrumentals are sample-free and cleared for commercial release.

Eventually, many notable artists and companies used instrumentals by Sinima Beats in their projects.  Artists such as DMX, Krizz Kaliko, Stat Quo, Canibus, E-40 and Silkk the Shocker have all recorded over instrumentals produced by Sinima Beats.  Subsequently, several instrumentals were placed on popular TV shows such as Keeping up with the Kardashians, The Real World, Road Rules, etc.

Notable artists 
 DMX (rapper)
 Fetty Wap
 Krizz Kaliko
 Tory Lanez
 The Game (rapper)
 Stat Quo - Time 2 Get Paid
 Young Buck
 Canibus
 E-40
 Jake Paul
 Soulja Boy
 Silkk the Shocker
 Emcee Kerser
 Bobby Creekwater
 Rhymefest
 Jin (rapper)
 G-Dep
 Steven Jo
 Grafh featuring Face tha Music - Don't Push Me
 Termanology
 Rah Digga
 Capone (rapper)
 Cutty Ranks
 Rashad McCants
 Kempi - Zet Um Op (Baby)
 Hopsin
 Sexion D'Assaut
 Qaraqan
 Goest Ryder

Companies 
 Marvel Studios
 Universal Music Group
 Killer Tracks
 Bunim/Murray Productions
 Boost Mobile
 EMI Music Publishing
 MTV
 Lafiosa Enterprise

TV/Film 
Instrumentals have been placed as background music on the following TV shows:
 The Wolverine (film) - Trailer
 Jimmy Kimmel Live
 Keeping Up with the Kardashians
 The Spin Crowd
 Kourtney and Khloé Take Miami
 Khloé & Lamar
 Kourtney and Kim Take New York
 The Real World
 The Challenge (TV series)
 Chopped (TV series)
 The Bad Girls Club

Today 
Sinima Beats has over 29 million video views according to YouTube with over 100,000 subscribers. They have also achieved over 116.9 million song plays and over 12.8 million page views worldwide on the internet according to their SoundClick statistics.

References 

 About the Company

External links 
 Official Website

Music companies of the United States
Music licensing organizations